Hyderabad railway station, popularly known as Hyderabad Deccan railway station or Nampally railway station, (station code: HYB) is located at Nampally, a locality in Hyderabad constructed and earlier run by the Nizam's Guaranteed State Railway of the Hyderabad State.

Introduction

Hyderabad Deccan railway station is a terminus, meaning the tracks go only in one direction. The station has 6 platforms. Platform No. 4 is the main platform that is directly located at the main entrance of the station, and is the first platform that one reaches after entering the station. Platform No. 4 is meant for trains departing from Hyderabad Deccan, such as Telangana Express, Charminar Express, Chennai Express, Godavari Express (PF. No. 5). Platform numbers 1, 2 and 3 are smaller platforms, and they are located on the "side" entrance of the station. These platforms are exclusively used for operating Hyderabad Multi Modal Transport System trains and the Warangal/ Kazipet Push-Pull Service, and other slow low priority trains. Platform number 5 is used for departure of trains and Platform No. 6 is exclusively used for the arrival and receival of incoming trains.

Administration 
It falls under the Secunderabad Division of South Central Railway. The station serves the city of Hyderabad by rail to and from many important towns and cities in the country.

MMTS Rail 
Hyderabad Deccan railway station is a train station in Hyderabad, Telangana, India. Localities like Salar Jung Museum, Charminar and Hyderguda are accessible from this station. MMTS trains run from Hyderabad Deccan to Lingampalli/Falaknuma.

Developments 
The station is powered by  solar power plant costing  funded by Persistent Foundation and EPC completed by Sunshot Technologies. It is connected to Nampally Metro Station with a covered walkway and railing.

Lines 
Hyderabad Multi-Modal Transport System

Originating express trains

Infrastructure 
This station has 7 pit lines for primary maintenance of trains originating from here.
Telangana Express to New Delhi
Dakshin Express to Hazrat Nizamuddin
Godavari Express to Visakhapatnam
Charminar Express to Chennai
Hussainsagar Express to Mumbai
Hyderabad–Mumbai Express
East Coast Express
Hyderabad–Sirpur Kaghaznagar Intercity Express
Hyderabad–Vasco da Gama Express
Hyderabad–Pune Express
Ajmer–Hyderabad Meenakshi Express
Narasapur–Hyderabad Express

And few weekly Express and Passenger trains are maintained here. Some of the trains which originating from  will come to this station for primary maintenance.

See also 
Nizam's Guaranteed State Railway

South Central Railway

References

External links 

 MMTS Trains

MMTS stations in Hyderabad
Secunderabad railway division
Railway stations opened in 1907
Transport in Hyderabad, India
Indian Railway A1 Category Stations